Qualified Zone Academy Bonds (QZABs) are a U.S. government debt instrument created by Section 226 of the Taxpayer Relief Act of 1997. It was later revised and regulations may be found in Section 54(E) of the U.S. Code. QZABs allow certain qualified schools to borrow at nominal interest rates (as low as zero percent) for costs incurred in connection with the establishment of special programs in partnership with the private sector.

History
The normal annual allocation each year has been $400,000,000. However, during 2008, 2009, and 2010, the American Recovery & Reinvestment Act (ARRA) increased these amounts to 1.4 billion. The 2011 allocation has returned to the $400,000,000 level. The allocation is divided up by all fifty states and US possessions. QZABs are a temporary program, subject to reauthorization.  The last authorization was for the calendar years 2012 and 2013.  Authorizations must be used within two years following the year for which they were given, meaning that authorizations given in 2012 must be used by December 31, 2014. , the reauthorization of the QZAB program for years 2014 and 2015 has not been passed by the U.S. Congress.

Qualification
Public schools (K-12) located in empowerment zones or enterprise communities and public schools with 35% or more of their student body on the free and/or reduced lunch programs are eligible to participate. 

In order for a school district to participate, a Zone Academy must be created.  The Zone Academy must create programs to enhance the curriculum, increase graduation rates, improve employment opportunities, and better prepare students for the workplace or higher education. 

Funds can be used for renovation and rehabilitation projects (including energy projects), as well as equipment purchases (including computers). QZABs cannot be used for new building construction.  The school district must obtain matching funds from a private-sector/non-profit partner equal to at least 10% of the cost of the proposed project. Information on the two QZAB federal mandates, 10% match and academy. 

The IRS began investigating QZABs, and, more specifically school districts that purchased donations. Several large schools were found to have spent nearly as much on the setting up the required zone academies, as the contributors match. Attorneys discovered that far from being a true donation, companies providing academies were in fact charging large setup fees or annual expenses to "maintain" their academy. (IRS Cases can be found here). Districts found with these invalid donations were required to repay the bond investor's the lost tax-credit, penalties to the IRS, and retire their bonds.

All state and local laws applicable to bonds also apply to QZABs, including Section 148 of the IRS Code. A qualified lender as defined by the law must purchase bonds. Qualified lenders can be insurance companies, some banks or other corporations actively engaged in lending (each qualifying entity is determined by the Internal Revenue Code governing each). The lender receives a tax credit in lieu of interest payments from the school. The IRS determines the amount of this tax credit. 

"Pay to play" contributions are strictly prohibited. Set up fees, discounts on equipment purchased with QZAB funds, or contributions associated with the district’s construction projects are not eligible. 

The renovation of Oak Ridge High School in Oak Ridge, Tennessee has been partially funded by $8 million in QZABs. Matching funds to qualify for QZAB funding were provided through private donations.

The renovation of Warren County School District in Warren County, Pennsylvania and Lehighton Area School District in Lehighton, PA were both funded by $39 and $9.5 million QZAB's respectively.  Matching funds to qualify for QZAB funding were provided through donations (including 10% match and Academy) from the National Education Foundation and State University of New York (SUNY).

References

External links
Qualified Zone Academy Bonds - Frequently Asked Questions, U.S. Department of Education website
QZAB 2014 State Allocations
QZAB 2012 & 2013 State Allocations
AASA Toolkit: Cost Effective School Financing
Warren County QZAB Academy Receives STEM Leadership Award (NEF) May 2013
Lehighton Area School Districts QZAB Academy Recognized as Leader
U.S. Department of Education Guidance on The Qualified Zone Academy Bonds, January 1998

Education finance in the United States
Government bonds issued by the United States